Carlos Guerrero (born November 20, 1957, Mexico City, Mexico) is a retired Mexican racing driver. He was a multiple-time Formula Three and Formula Two champion in his native Mexico. Guerrero later raced in the 1995 and 1996 CART seasons with 17 career starts, including the 1995 Indianapolis 500. He was eliminated in a crash on the first lap, becoming one of a handful of drivers to qualify for only one Indianapolis 500 and fail to complete a lap. His best career finish in CART was 11th position at the 1995 Toyota Grand Prix of Long Beach.

He is not related to Roberto Guerrero, who is Colombian.

Racing record

American Open Wheel
(key)

CART

References

1957 births
Mexican Formula Three Championship drivers
Mexican Indianapolis 500 drivers
Formula 3 Sudamericana drivers
Champ Car drivers
Indianapolis 500 drivers
Living people
Mexican racing drivers
British Formula 3000 Championship drivers
Racing drivers from Mexico City
World Sportscar Championship drivers